Pir Sara (also Romanized as Pīr Sarā; also known as Pīrehsarā) is a village in Howmeh Rural District, in the Central District of Masal County, Gilan Province, Iran. At the 2006 census, its population was 193, in 53 families.

References 

Populated places in Masal County